Fighting Through may refer to:
 Fighting Through (1919 film), a silent American drama film
 Fighting Through (1934 film), an American Western film
 Fighting Thru, a 1930 American Western film